Victoria Park is a stop on the Region of Waterloo's Ion rapid transit system. It is located alongside Charles Street, just west of Gaukel Street, in Kitchener. It opened in 2019.

The station's feature wall consists of brown stone tiles with flowing, random striations.  The platform is connected with Charles Street's sidewalks at either end, and pedestrians passing through walk along the platform.

The station is located at the southwest corner of the intersection of Charles Street West and Gaukel Street. It is immediately adjacent to 44 Gaukel Street, a modernist building constructed in 1962–64, which was formerly a Canada Post depot before it was converted to its current use as an arts centre. Across Gaukel Street is the Charles Street Transit Terminal, the former Grand River Transit hub in Kitchener until the launch of light rail service in 2019; it is now completely shuttered. Across Charles Street from the station is the 31-storey Charlie West condominium development, one of the tallest in the area.

The section of Gaukel Street between Charles Street and Joseph Street was pedestrianized in the summer of 2020, during the COVID-19 pandemic. This came after a campaign by residents to pedestrianize the street, with city planners identifying it as a significant pedestrian corridor connecting the city hall and King Street with Victoria Park and its adjacent light rail station.

References

External links

 

Ion light rail stations
Railway stations in Kitchener, Ontario
2019 establishments in Ontario